Arakan (  or  ) is a historic coastal region in Southeast Asia. Its borders faced the Bay of Bengal to its west, the Indian subcontinent to its north and Burma proper to its east. The Arakan Mountains isolated the region and made it accessible only by the Indian subcontinent and the sea. The region now forms the Rakhine State in Myanmar.

Arakan became one of the earliest regions in Southeast Asia to embrace Dharmic religions, particularly Buddhism and Hinduism. Islam arrived with Arab merchants in the 8th century. The Kingdom of Mrauk U emerged as an independent Arakanese kingdom for 300 years. During the Age of Discovery and Bengal Subah's major economic development, Arakan caught the interest of the Dutch East India Company and the Portuguese Empire. In the middle of the 17th century, it was dominated by the Islamic Mughal Emperor Aurangzeb. Arakan steadily declined from the 18th century onwards after its loss to the Mughal Empire.

After conquest by the British East India Company, Arakan became one of the divisions of British India and received settlers from the neighboring Chittagong Division of the Bengal Presidency. In 1937, it became a division of British Burma. Arakan Division was once a leading rice exporter. During the Second World War, the region was occupied by Imperial Japan. The Allied Forces liberated Arakan during the Burma Campaign. It continued to be an administrative division after Burmese independence; and later became a province. In the early 1960s, the northern part of Arakan was governed from Rangoon as the Mayu Frontier District.

In 1982, the Burmese nationality law stripped many inhabitants of the region, most notably the Rohingya, of their citizenship. In 1989, the Burmese military junta changed the official name of Burma to Myanmar. In the 1990s, the junta changed the name of Arakan State to Rakhine State — a name reflecting the dominance of the Rakhine majority. Many in the Rohingya minority strongly opposed the change. The region has seen conflict between the Burmese state, Rakhine nationalists and Rohingya rebels. In more recent times, Rakhine State has been notable for the exodus of refugees into neighboring countries because of military operations by the Tatmadaw (Myanmar Armed Forces).

Etymology
Claudius Ptolemy identified Arakan as Argyré. Portuguese records spelled the name as Arracao. The name was spelled as Araccan in many old European maps and publications. The region was named as Arakan Division during British rule in Burma.

History

Early inhabitants 

It is unclear who the earliest inhabitants were; some historians believe the earliest settlers included the Burmese Mro tribe but there is a lack of evidence and no clear tradition of their origin or written records of their history. Arakanese traditional history holds that Arakan was inhabited by the Rakhine since 3000 BCE, but there is no archaeological evidence to support the claim. According to British historian Daniel George Edward Hall, who wrote extensively on the history of Burma, "The Burmese do not seem to have settled in Arakan until possibly as late as the tenth century AD. Hence earlier dynasties are thought to have been Indian, ruling  over a population similar to that of Bengal.  All the capitals known to history have been in the north near modern Akyab".

Ancient Indic influence

Arakan came under strong Indic influence from the Indian subcontinent, particularly the ancient kingdoms of the Ganges delta. Arakan was one of the first regions in Southeast Asia to adopt Dharmic religions. It became one of the earliest Indianized kingdoms in Southeast Asia. Buddhist missionaries from the Mauryan Empire traveled through Arakan to other parts of Southeast Asia.

First states

Due to the evidence of Sanskrit inscriptions found in the region, historians believe the founders of the first Arakanese state were Indian. The first Arakanese state flourished in Dhanyawadi between the 4th and 6th centuries. Sircar has dated King Chandrodaya at the start of 3rd century AD and there are king which are mentioned even prior to him. It is concluded that from King Chandrodaya a new religion of Buddhism took root in Arakan as the prior kings are regarded less religious compared to the later. The city was the center of a large trade network linked to India, China and Persia. Power then shifted to the city of Waithali, where the Candra dynasty ruled. Waithali became a wealthy trading port. The Chandra-ruled Harikela state was known as the Kingdom of Ruhmi to the Arabs.

Arrival of Islam
Since in the 8th century, Arab merchants began conducting missionary activities in southeast Asia. Some researchers have speculated that Muslims used trade routes in the region to travel to India and China. A southern branch of the Silk Road connected India, Burma and China since the neolithic period.

Rakhine migration
It is unclear whether the Rakhine people were one of the tribes of the Burmese Pyu city-states because the people in those states at the time spoke a Tibeto-Burman language while Arakan (Rakhine) speakers are from the Sino-Tibetan language family. They began migrating to Arakan through the Arakan Mountains in the 9th century. The Rakhines settled in the valley of the Lemro River. Their cities included Sambawak I, Pyinsa, Parein, Hkrit, Sambawak II, Myohaung, Toungoo and Launggret. The cities flourished between the 11th and 15th centuries. The Burmese invaded Arakan in 1406.

Indo-Islamic influence

After the Burmese invasion, Min Saw Mon fled to Gaurh in the Bengal Sultanate, where he stayed in exile for 24 years after being granted asylum by Sultan Ghiyasuddin Azam Shah. The Bengal Sultanate was one of the major Islamic states established after the Muslim conquest of the Indian subcontinent.

In 1430, Min Saw Mon regained control of Arakan with help from the Bengal Sultanate. He established his new capital in the city of Mrauk U. Arakan became a vassal state of the Bengal Sultanate and recognized Bengali sovereignty over some territory of northern Arakan. Arakanese kings adopted Islamic titles and struck the Bengali taka. Min Saw Mon was styled as Suleiman Shah. Bengalis settled in Arakan and formed their settlements.

Kingdom of Mrauk U

Min Saw Mon's successors in the Kingdom of Mrauk U sought to end the Bengal Sultanate's hegemony. Min Khayi (Ali Khan) was the first to challenge Bengali hegemony. Ba Saw Phyu (Kalima Shah) defeated Bengal Sultan Rukunuddin Barbak Shah in 1459. Min Bin (Zabuk Shah) conquered Chittagong. Taking advantage of the Mughal Empire's invasion campaign of Bengal, the Arakan navy and pirates dominated a coastline of 1000 miles, spanning from the Sundarbans to Moulmein. The kingdom's coastline was frequented by Arab, Dutch, Danish and Portuguese traders. Control of the Kaladan River and Lemro River valleys led to increased international trade, making Mrauk U prosperous. The reigns of Min Phalaung (Sikender Shah), Min Rajagiri (Salim Shah I) and grandson Min Khamaung (Hussein Shah) strengthened the wealth and power of Mrauk U. Arakan colluded in the slave trade with the Portuguese settlement in Chittagong. After conquering the port city of Syriam in the early 1600s, Arakan appointed the Portuguese mercenary Philip De Brito e Nicota as the governor of Syriam. But Nicota later transferred Syriam to the authority of Portuguese India.

Even after independence from the Sultans of Bengal, the Arakanese kings continued the custom of maintaining Muslim titles. They compared themselves to Sultans and fashioned themselves after Mughal rulers. They also continued to employ Indians and Muslims in prestigious positions within the royal administration. The court adopted Indian and Islamic fashions from neighbouring Bengal. Mrauk U hosted mosques, temples, shrines, seminaries and libraries. Syed Alaol was a renowned poet of Arakan. Indian and Muslim influence continued on Arakanese affairs for 350 years.

In 1660, Shah Shuja, the brother of Emperor Aurangzeb and a claimant of the Peacock Throne, received asylum in Mrauk U. Members of Shuja's entourage were recruited in the Arakanese army and court. They were kingmakers in Arakan until the Burmese conquest. Arakan suffered a major defeat to the forces of Mughal Bengal during the Battle of Chittagong in 1666, when Mrauk U lost control of southeast Bengal. The Mrauk U dynasty's reign continued until the 18th century.

Burmese conquest
The Konbaung Dynasty conquered Arakan in 1784. Mrauk U was devastated during the invasion. The Burmese Empire executed thousands of men and deported a considerable portion of people from the Arakanese population to central Burma.

British Empire

The Burmese Empire ceded Arakan to the British East India Company in the 1826 Treaty of Yandabo. Arakan became one of the divisions of British India. Initially governed as part of the Bengal Presidency, it received many settlers from neighboring Chittagong Division. The settlers became influential in commerce, agriculture and shipping. In 1937, Arakan became part of Burma Province, which was separated from India into a distinct crown colony. During World War II, Arakan endured the Japanese occupation of Burma. The Burma National Army and the pro-British V Force were active in the region. Sectarian tensions flared during the Arakan massacres in 1942. Japanese rule ended with the successful Burma Campaign by Allied forces.

During British rule, Arakan Division was one of the largest rice exporters in the world.  The division's seaport and capital Akyab were dominated by Arakanese Indians, which caused tension with Arakanese Burmese. Both groups were represented as natives in the Legislative Council of Burma and the Legislature of Burma. In the 1940s, Arakanese Muslims appealed to Muhammad Ali Jinnah to incorporate the townships of the Mayu River valley into the Dominion of Pakistan.

Burmese independence

Arakan became one of the Union of Burma's divisions after independence from British rule. Burma was a parliamentary democracy until the 1962 Burmese coup d'état. The northern part of Arakan was governed by the central government in Rangoon in the early 1960s. Known as the Mayu Frontier District, it covered townships near the border with East Pakistan.

In 1982, the Burmese junta enacted the Burmese nationality law which did not recognize Arakanese Indians as one of Burma's ethnic groups, thereby stripping them of their citizenship. In 1989, the Burmese government altered the country's name from Burma to Myanmar. In the 1990s, the State Peace and Development Council changed the name of Arakan State to Rakhine State. The province was renamed after the Rakhine ethnic group. However, the new name is not accepted as legitimate by many in both the Rakhine and Rohingya communities, instead preferring the historical term Arakan.

Rakhine-led groups like the Arakan Liberation Army have sought independence for the region. Other groups, including the Arakan Rohingya National Organization, have demanded autonomy. The region witnessed military crackdowns during Operation King Dragon in 1978; in 1991 and 1992 after the 8888 uprising and 1990 Burmese general election; the 2012 Rakhine State riots, the 2015 Rohingya refugee crisis and Rohingya persecution in Myanmar (2016-present).

Geography

Arakan is a coastal geographic region in Lower Burma. It comprises a long narrow strip of land along the eastern seaboard of the Bay of Bengal and stretches from the Naf River estuary on the border of the Chittagong Hills area (in Bangladesh) in the north to the Gwa River in the south. The Arakan region is about 400 miles (640 km) long from north to south and is about 90 miles (145 km) wide at its broadest. The Arakan Mountains (also called Arakan Yoma), a range that forms the eastern boundary of the region, isolates Arakan from the rest of Burma. The coast has several sizable offshore islands, including Cheduba and Ramree. The region's principal rivers are the Nāf estuary and the Mayu, Kaladan, and Lemro rivers. One-tenth of Arakan's generally hilly land is cultivated. Rice is the dominant crop in the delta areas, where most of the population is concentrated. Other crops include fruits, chilies, dha and tobacco.

The main towns are coastal and include Sittwe (Akyab), Sandoway, Kyaukpyu and Taungup.

Demographics 
The people of Arakan have historically been called the Arakanese. The population consists of Tibeto-Burmans and Indo-Aryans. Tibeto-Burman Arakanese mostly speak the Arakanese language, also known as Rakhine and closely related to Burmese. Most Indo-Aryan Arakanese speak the Rohingya language. Other languages spoken by smaller communities in Rakhine state include the Tibeto-Burman Chak, Asho Chin, Ekai, Kumi, Laitu, Mru, Songlai, Sumtu and Uppu, as well as the Indo-Aryan Chakma.

The government of Myanmar recognizes Tibeto-Burman Arakanese as the Rakhine people. It also recognizes sections of the Muslim community, including the Kamein. But Myanmar does not recognize the Rohingya.

Arakan Division had the largest percentage of Indians in British Burma.

See also
Military history of Arakan
History of Southeast Asia

References

Sources

External links

.
Historical regions in Myanmar
Regions of Myanmar
Former countries in Burmese history